The Ixtaclum Shale is a geologic formation in Mexico. It preserves fossils dating back to the Paleogene period.

See also

 List of fossiliferous stratigraphic units in Mexico

References

External links 
 

Geologic formations of Mexico
Paleogene Mexico
Shale formations